Makai Polk (born August 4, 2001) is an American football wide receiver for the New York Giants of the National Football League (NFL). He played college football at California before transferring to Mississippi State.

Early life and high school
Polk grew up in Richmond, California and initially attended Susan Miller Dorsey High School before transferring to El Cerrito High School before his senior year.

College career
Polk began his collegiate career with the California Golden Bears. He finished his freshman season with 19 receptions for 295 yards and 2 touchdowns. Polk played in four games in the Golden Bears' COVID-19-shortened 2020 season and caught 17 passes for 183 yards and one touchdown. After the end of the season, Polk entered the transfer portal.

Polk ultimately transferred to Mississippi State. He was named a starter going into his first season with the team and led the Southeastern Conference with 105 receptions for 1,048 yards and nine touchdowns. Following the end of the season, he declared that he would forgo his remaining collegiate eligibility and enter the 2022 NFL Draft.

Professional career

Baltimore Ravens 
Polk was signed as a free agent out of college by the Baltimore Ravens in May 2022, after going undrafted. He was waived on August 30, 2022, and signed to the practice squad the next day. He was waived on September 27.

New York Giants 
On September 28, 2022, Polk was signed by the New York Giants to their practice squad. He signed a reserve/future contract on January 22, 2023.

References

External links
New York Giants bio
California Golden Bears bio
Mississippi State Bulldogs bio

2001 births
Living people
Players of American football from California
Sportspeople from Richmond, California
American football wide receivers
California Golden Bears football players
Mississippi State Bulldogs football players
Baltimore Ravens players
New York Giants players